The Big Blue was a Lampson LTL-1500 Transi-Lift heavy lift crawler crane that collapsed on July 14, 1999, killing three iron workers.

Accident
Three Iron Workers Local 8 members, Jeffrey Wischer, William DeGrave, and Jerome Starr, were killed when the suspended personnel platform in which they were observing the lift was hit by the falling crane. A safety inspector was filming construction of the stadium on that day and captured the collapse on video as it occurred.

An investigation revealed that although the effects of side winds on the crane itself had been calculated, it had not been considered for the load the crane was lifting.

Aftermath and memorial
The widows of the workers, Marjorie DeGrave, Ramona Dulde-Starr and Patricia Wischer, settled a lawsuit against Mitsubishi Heavy Industries of America, the company responsible for constructing the retractable roof of the stadium, for an undisclosed total of over $99 million.

Teamwork, a bronze sculpture by Omri Amrany, was installed at Miller Park in 2001 to honor the three workers. The Brewers wore an Ironworkers Local 8 memorial patch on the left breast of their jerseys following the accident for the remainder of the 1999 season.

Work on Miller Park was later completed with a new crane, a red and white Van Seumeren Demag CC-12600.

References

External links
 Video of the accident

1999 disasters in the United States
Accidental deaths in Wisconsin
Construction accidents in the United States
Disasters in Wisconsin
1990s in Milwaukee
Individual cranes (machines)
July 1999 events in the United States
1999 in baseball
1999 in Wisconsin